Batman: Mystery of the Batwoman is a 2003 American animated superhero film based on the animated series The New Batman Adventures. Released in the U.S. in October 2003, the film was produced by Warner Bros. Animation and is the fourth film in the DC Animated Universe, taking place between the end of The New Batman Adventures and the flashback sequence depicted in Batman Beyond: Return of the Joker.

Plot
After the events of The New Batman Adventures, the Joker and Harley Quinn have been married and are on their honeymoon out of Gotham City, leaving Batman and Robin to face a brand new mystery, a new heroine, Batwoman has arrived in the city whose identity is a mystery. While she claims to fight for justice, Batwoman forsakes Batman's code to never take a life. Batman must figure out who she is, while stopping the Penguin and Rupert Thorne from selling illegal weapons to the fictional nation of Kasnia. The two villains employ gangster Carlton Duquesne to provide protection.

Batman, with Robin, sets out to stop Batwoman from making mistakes as she tries to take out the villains and as he encounters numerous twists, setbacks, and apparent false leads in determining her true identity. The newest gadget on display is a wind glider used by Batwoman that utilizes some of the most advanced technology ever seen in Gotham City. Bruce Wayne, Batman's alter ego, also becomes romantically involved with Kathy Duquesne, the crime boss' daughter.

In addition to Kathy, Bruce is introduced to two other women who, as his investigation into the Batwoman's true identity continues, seem to fall well into suspicion: Dr. Roxanne "Rocky" Ballantine, a new employee of Wayne Tech, who seemingly but briefly forms a bond with Tim Drake and whose technology development is used by Batwoman against  Penguin; and Detective Harvey Bullock's new partner Sonia Alcana, who seems to know too much about the weapons being smuggled by the Penguin and Carlton Duquesne. With Carlton unable to stop Batwoman's raids on the facilities used to hold the various weapons, the Penguin calls Bane for additional support to ensure that there are no more losses as a result of the Batwoman.

Not long after Bane's arrival in Gotham, it is revealed that there is not one, but three Batwomen, all of whom were the women suspected by Batman. Kathy and Sonia met taking art classes at college, and Sonia and Rocky were roommates; and they all harbor grudges against the Penguin, Thorne, and Carleton Duquesne: the Penguin had framed Rocky's fiancé Kevin, Thorne had bankrupted Sonia's family, and Carlton Duquesne's war with a rival gang got Kathy's mother (his wife) killed. They had taken turns posing as Batwoman to remove suspicion on any one of the three: Rocky invented Batwoman's gadgetry with Kathy's funding; and Sonia invented the Batwoman persona itself as a tribute to Batman, who had saved her life nine years earlier and inspired her to become a police officer.

Kathy plants a bomb in the ship taking the weapons into international waters for the exchange - but not before Bane unmasks her. Kathy and Batman narrowly escape as the bomb goes off, while Carlton forsakes his ties to Thorne and the Penguin to save his daughter's life, and Bane falls into the Gotham River. Sonia takes the fall for the Batwoman operation, resigns from the GCPD, and decides to leave Gotham. Batman gives Sonia evidence that he discovered which helps clear Rocky's fiancé. Carlton agrees to testify against Thorne and the Penguin. After she reconciles with her father, Kathy drives off with Bruce.

Voice cast

 Kevin Conroy as Bruce Wayne / Batman
 Kimberly Brooks as Kathleen "Kathy" Duquesne
 Kelly Ripa as Dr. Roxanne "Rocky" Ballantine
 Elisa Gabrielli as Detective Sonia Alcana
 Kyra Sedgwick as Batwoman
 David Ogden Stiers as Penguin
 Kevin Michael Richardson as Carlton Duquesne
 Héctor Elizondo as Bane
 Robert Costanzo as Detective Harvey Bullock
 Tim Dang as Kevin (uncredited)
 Bob Hastings as Commissioner James Gordon
 Eli Marienthal as Tim Drake / Robin
 Tara Strong as Barbara Gordon
 John Vernon as Rupert Thorne
 Efrem Zimbalist Jr. as Alfred Pennyworth

Cherie performs the single "Betcha Never" in the Iceberg Lounge as herself.

Production
Despite that the majority of returning characters retain the same designs from The New Batman Adventures era, the character animation is brighter and more lively than from the series. Rupert Thorne was featured in the original show Batman: The Animated Series, but not in The New Batman Adventures. As such, the animators had to create a new appearance for him specifically for this film; he is streamlined and seems to have lost some weight compared to his previous appearance. the animation was outsourced to DR Movie.

The role of Penguin had previously been voiced by Paul Williams in the animated series, who did not voice Penguin in this film. The reasoning behind this decision was Alan Burnett deciding to experiment with a different voice, and bring more of a threatening ambience to the character. Interestingly, Bruce Timm who was not involved with film, mentioned he wouldn't have recast Williams, but that he nonetheless respected Burnett's decision. This film also marked the final performances of Bob Hastings as Commissioner James Gordon, and John Vernon as Rupert Thorne before their deaths in 2014 and 2005 respectively as well as being the final film for Hastings.

Series writers Alan Burnett and Michael Reaves wrote the script. The film also shows further continuity with previous Bruce Timm-developed Batman shows: Barbara Gordon's romantic relationship with Bruce Wayne (as mentioned in Batman Beyond) is coming to an end, Dick Grayson has left Gotham to fight crime in Blüdhaven as Nightwing, and Robin and Batgirl are older than their depictions in The New Batman Adventures, but have not yet been forced to quit in the wake of the flashback events in Return of the Joker as the film is set before those events.

Chase Me

The US DVD release of Batman: Mystery of the Batwoman (October 21, 2003) included the bonus short silent film Chase Me. Chase Me is a 2003 American direct-to-video animated short film also based on the animated series The New Batman Adventures. The silent film was produced by Warner Bros. Animation, and follows Batman as he chases Catwoman across Gotham City. The chase sequences are accompanied by a soundtrack mix of a quiet piano score, and jazz style score that plays up the chase.

The film was written by Paul Dini and Alan Burnett and was directed by Curt Geda. It was co-produced by Geda, Burnett, Margaret M. Dean, Benjamin Melniker, and Batman-producer Michael Uslan. The score is by Lolita Ritmanis.

Chase Me is also included as part of the main feature on video streaming sites such as Amazon Video.

Soundtrack 
The soundtrack album, composed by Lolita Ritmanis, produced by John Takis and mastered by James Nelson was released on March 29, 2016 by La-La Land Records. Bonus tracks and the score to the animated short "Chase Me" were also included.

 Track list
 Main Title (2:02)
 Opening* (4:26)
 He's Been Waiting / Weapons Factory (1:12)
 Start Flexing (1:19)
 The Reason I Called / Rocky Ballantine (1:52)
 Bat-Signal* (0:42)
 I'll Get Back to You / Factory / After the Explosion (4:47)
 Chase Through Store / Rear-View Mirror (2:12)
 Bruce and Kathy (2:01)
 Real Muscle / Get Out! (1:54)
 Paint the Town (1:05)
 Revolving Door / Time to Burn a Bat (3:59)
 I Was Wrong About You (0:37)
 Subway / Identified (0:45)
 I Don't Want to See You / High Stakes (1:27)
 The Ship Sails Tonight / Batwoman in Flight (1:49)
 Close to Our Goal (1:36)
 This Is It / Ship Leaves the Harbor (2:22)
 Penguin Gets a Call / Trouble (2:22)
 Bon Voyage, Señor Batman* (1:21)
 Close Look / It Has to End / Explosions (3:18)
 Ship Is Going Down (5:17)
 Bane's Demise (1:25)
 Bullock Sees Sonia / The Badge (1:32)
 I Missed You (1:26)
 Mystery End Credits (1:25)
 Total Score Time: 54:13
Chase Me

 Total Score Time: 6:28 
Bonus tracks

Reception
The film holds  approval rating on Rotten Tomatoes. DVD Talk rated the film as 3.5 stars of 5 stars as "Recommended".

References

External links
 Warner Bros. website at the Wayback Machine (archived 9 September 2006)
 DC page
 
CW Seed

2003 films
2003 animated films
2003 direct-to-video films
2003 action films
2000s American animated films
Animated films about revenge
2000s animated superhero films
Direct-to-video interquel films
American children's animated action films
American children's animated mystery films
American children's animated superhero films
Animated Batman films
Works based on Batman: The Animated Series
Direct-to-video animated films based on DC Comics
Warner Bros. Animation animated films
Warner Bros. direct-to-video animated films
DC Animated Universe films
American direct-to-video films
Films directed by Curt Geda
Toonami
Batwoman in other media
The New Batman Adventures
Films with screenplays by Alan Burnett
2000s English-language films